Peter J. D. Wilson (born 5 March 1955) is a Scottish and Irish curler and curling coach.

As of 2015, he was a President of Irish Curling Association.

Teams

Record as a coach of national teams

References

External links

Living people
1955 births

Irish male curlers
Irish curling coaches
Scottish male curlers